Gila is a feminine given name which is borne by:

 Gila Almagor (born 1939), Israeli actress
 Gila Finkelstein (born 1950), Israeli former politician
 Gila Gamliel (born 1974), Israeli politician
 Gila Golan (born 1940), Polish-born actress who immigrated to Israel in the 1950s
 Gila Goldstein (1947–2017), Israeli actress, singer and transgender rights activist
 Gila Hanna, Canadian mathematics educator and philosopher of mathematics
 Gila Katsav (born 1948), Israel's first lady (2000–2007)
 Gila Martow (born 1961), Canadian politician
 Gila von Weitershausen (born 1944), German actress

Feminine given names